Jerry Coker (born November 28, 1932) is an American jazz saxophonist and pedagogue.

Coker was born in South Bend, Indiana. He attended Indiana University in the early 1950s, but left school to become a member of Woody Herman's Herd. Coker eventually earned undergraduate and graduate degrees while he taught jazz at Sam Houston State University (then Sam Houston State Teachers College). He recorded under his own name in the mid-1950s and as a sideman with Nat Pierce, Dick Collins, and Mel Lewis; later that decade he played with Stan Kenton. In 1960 he began teaching and increasingly turned to music education and composition. He taught at Duke University, University of Miami, North Texas State University, and started the Studio Music and Jazz program at the University of Tennessee, where he was a professor of music from the 1980s through the 2000s.

Discography
Modern Music from Indiana University (Fantasy Records, 1956)
Intro to Jazz, with the Rudy Salvini Big Band (Jazz Records, 1957)
Extension, with the Clare Fischer Orchestra (Discovery Records, 1984)
...A Re-Emergence, with the Frank Sullivan Trio (Revelation, 1984)
Rebirth (Revelation, 1987)

Bibliography
Improvising Jazz (1964/ rev. ed. 1986)
Patterns for Jazz (c1970)
The Jazz Idiom (1975)
Listening to Jazz (c1978; rev. as How to Listen to Jazz, n.p., n.d.)
The Complete Method for Improvisation (c1980)
Jerry Coker’s Jazz Keyboard (c1984)
The Teaching of Jazz (1989)
How to Practice Jazz (c1990)
Elements of the Jazz Language for the Developing Improviser (1991)
The Jazz Age In America (2020)

References

American jazz saxophonists
American male saxophonists
American jazz composers
Musicians from Indiana
American male jazz composers